Ananya Agarwal is an Indian television child actress.

Career
Ananya made her debut with Tujh Sang Preet Lagai Sajna as Prerna, and she was playing role in Amrit Manthan as Gurbani, daughter of Nimrit and Agam on Life OK. Ananya Agarwal has joined Zee TV's Bandhan to play the role of Darpan.

Television

Film

References

External links
 
 

Living people
Indian television child actresses
Indian television actresses
21st-century Indian child actresses
Year of birth missing (living people)